Otto Rothe (6 November 1924 – 9 January 1970) was a German equestrian. He was born in Samonienen in East Prussia (today part of Poland). He competed in equestrian at the 1952 Summer Olympics in Helsinki, where he won a silver medal in the team eventing, and placed eleventh in the individual contest. He competed in equestrian at the 1956 Summer Olympics in Stockholm, where he won a silver medal in the team competition in eventing (along with August Lütke-Westhues  and Klaus Wagner). Rothe died in a car accident in 1970.

References

1924 births
1970 deaths
People from Gołdap County
Sportspeople from Warmian-Masurian Voivodeship
People from East Prussia
German male equestrians
Equestrians at the 1952 Summer Olympics
Equestrians at the 1956 Summer Olympics
Olympic equestrians of Germany
Olympic equestrians of the United Team of Germany
Olympic silver medalists for Germany
Olympic silver medalists for the United Team of Germany
Olympic medalists in equestrian
Road incident deaths in Germany
Medalists at the 1952 Summer Olympics
Medalists at the 1956 Summer Olympics